Rarotonga was a Mexican comic book series in the Lágrimas, Risas y Amor comics published by EDAR which appeared between 1951 and 1998. The main character of the comic series was Rarotonga, a jungle queen of an island of the same name who occupied her days dancing and romancing travelers. Within the publication were tears, laughter and love, and dedicated to mostly romantic themed storylines.

In 1978 a Mexican film of the same name directed by Raúl Ramírez was made using material from the comic. In 1992, the Mexican band Café Tacuba wrote a song called "Rarotonga" about the comic.

Notes

See also
 El pecado de Oyuki
 María Isabel
 Rubí
 Yesenia
 Gabriel y Gabriela
 Alondra
 Memin Pinguin

References
 Harold E. Hinds, Charles M. Tatum (1992), Not Just for Children: The Mexican Comic Book in the Late 1960s and 1970s, ; pp. 58–59

External links
 Marveleando: Rarotonga

Mexican comics
Jungle girls
Jungle (genre) comics
Romance comics
Comics characters introduced in 1951
1951 comics debuts
1998 comics endings
Female characters in comics
Mexican comics adapted into films